Sweatshop is a 2009 American horror film directed by Stacy Davidson and starring Ashley Kay, Melanie Donihoo, and Peyton Wetzel. It follows a group of early aged adults who are stalked and viciously murdered by a humongous welder with an equally massive sledgehammer and his two women followers after breaking into an abandoned factory to throw a rave in order to make profits off pimping out their friends.

Plot
Charlie and her friends break into an abandoned warehouse and begin setting up an impromptu party. Unbeknownst to them, something lurks in this dark place... a presence so horrific, so monstrous, it has no name. Fueled by uncontrollable, unprovoked rage, this Beast knows only one thing - Charlie and her companions chose the wrong building, and they're about to pay for it.

Critical response

Dread Central awarded 4/5, saying it managed to "create a fully immersive, cohesive mini-universe". Horror.com found it "effective and original" despite some longueurs and questionable acting. Horror Talk was more critical, awarding 1.5/5, criticizing the story and acting, and noting the low budget.

References

External links
 
 

2009 horror films
2009 films
American independent films
Films set in Houston
Films shot in Houston
American splatter films
2000s English-language films
2000s American films